Thomas Leamy (1898–1969) was an Australian rugby league footballer who played in the 1920s and 1930s.

Playing career
A Newtown junior, Tom Leamy was a hooker for the Newtown club during the 1920s. He played seven seasons for Newtown between 1923–1930. 

Leamy had one grand final appearance for the club, playing hooker in the 1929 Grand Final against South Sydney, and also represented  New South Wales on five occasions in 1924 and 1925.

Tom Leamy died on 17 June 1969, aged 71.

References

1898 births
1969 deaths
Australian rugby league players
Newtown Jets players
New South Wales rugby league team players
Rugby league hookers
Rugby league players from New South Wales